Glass Beach (stylized as glass beach) is an American indie rock band from Los Angeles. Their music has been described as "heavy indie rock", blending influences including punk rock, math rock, and mid-century jazz. They cite some of their musical influences as Jeff Rosenstock, They Might Be Giants, and The Brave Little Abacus.

The band's formation and music is closely tied to internet communities, and according to The Washington Post has "developed a cultish online following". In early 2020, the Los Angeles Times predicted that the band "likely won't be playing cozy venues like All Star Lanes for much longer."

History 
In 2015, lead singer McClendon (known professionally as Classic J) made the move to Los Angeles, California from their hometown of Burleson, Texas, where they couch-surfed and worked on their solo project, Casio Dad. During this time they released an EP titled He's Not With Us Anymore. Shortly after, while attending the University of Minnesota Morris, close friends Jonas Newhouse and William White heard a song from McClendon's new EP on their school's radio station, and immediately found interest in the musician. The trio quickly became friends, and soon Newhouse and White joined McClendon in Los Angeles to live together and form Glass Beach. For the next three years, the group worked diligently on their first album, The First Glass Beach Album, which debuted on May 18, 2019 under Run for Cover Records.

Following the album's release, musician and artist Layne Smith joined the group as the band's guitarist after bonding over Dungeons & Dragons, and immediately got to work developing the band's live sound and became a key member of the group. 

The band released several singles and a remix album following The First Glass Beach Album, for many of them initially on Bandcamp. These included  "running", originally written for Bill & Ted Face the Music before it was cut from the film, and released in 2020. The band released a cover of "classic j dies and goes to hell", a song on their first album, in celebration of the song achieving 1 million streams on Spotify. It covered Car Seat Headrest's "Beach Life-In-Death" in January 2021, as well as "Welcome to the Black Parade" by My Chemical Romance in July of the same year, for Pride Month. The remix album, featuring Bartees Strange, Skylar Spence, Ska Tune Network, and Dogleg, was also released in 2021.

Members 
 J McClendon - vocals/guitar (2015-present)
 Jonas Newhouse - bass (2015-present)
 William White - drums (2015-present)
 Layne Smith - lead guitar (2019-present)

Discography

Studio albums 
 The First Glass Beach Album (2019)

Remix albums 
 Alchemist Rats Beg Bashful (Remixes) (2021)

Singles 

 "1015" (2020)
 "running" (2020)

 “classic j dies and gets a million streams on spotify” (2020)
 "beach life in death" (2021)
 "welcome to the black parade" (2021)

References

Musical groups from Los Angeles
Musical groups established in 2015
2015 establishments in California